Benzal chloride is an organic compound with the formula C6H5CHCl2.  This colourless liquid is a lachrymator and is used as a building block in organic synthesis.

Preparation and usage
Benzal chloride is produced by the free radical chlorination of toluene, being preceded in the process by benzyl chloride (C6H5CH2Cl) and followed by benzotrichloride (C6H5CCl3):
 C6H5CH3 + Cl2 → C6H5CH2Cl + HCl
 C6H5CH2Cl + Cl2 → C6H5CHCl2 + HCl
 C6H5CHCl2 + Cl2 → C6H5CCl3 + HCl

Benzylic halides are typically strong alkylating agents, and for this reason benzal chloride is treated as a hazardous compound.  

Treatment of benzal chloride with sodium gives stilbene.

Most benzal chloride main industrial use is as a precursor to benzaldehyde. This conversion involves hydrolysis in the presence of base:
 C6H5CHCl2 + H2O → C6H5CHO + 2 HCl

References

Organochlorides
IARC Group 2A carcinogens
Phenyl compounds
Benzyl compounds